Muara Gembong is a district of Bekasi Regency, West Java, Indonesia.

Demographics
As of the 2020 Indonesian census, the district has a population of 40,231, with an average population growth rate of 1.24% annually since 2010. The gender ratio is 104.9.

Geography
The district is located at the delta of the Citarum River, where significant sedimentation still occurs. It is located on the Bay of Jakarta.

Since around 2009, coastal erosion has heavily impacted the low-lying, coastal villages, with several rukun tetangga (neighborhood-level administrative divisions) having been lost to the sea. The local government has been attempting to reduce the impact through the plantation of mangrove trees in vulnerable areas. It is prone to coastal flooding.

Economy
Since at least the 1970s, the coastal communities has been engaging in milkfish and shrimp farming.

References

Bekasi Regency
Districts of West Java